American country music singer and songwriter Chris Young has released eight studio albums, twenty two singles (one of which was released twice), and nineteen music videos. Ten of his singles have reached number one on either the US Billboard Hot Country Songs or Country Airplay charts. In 2006, Young rose to fame as the winner of season four of American reality singing competition Nashville Star. He released his debut self-titled album in October of that year, which produced two singles that failed to reach the Top 40 of the Country Songs chart.

He released his second studio album, The Man I Want to Be, in September 2009. Lead single "Voices" initially peaked at 37 on the country chart, but was successfully re-released in 2010 after Young experienced a commercial breakthrough with subsequent singles. All three singles released from the album were number one hits and received at least a Gold certification from RIAA.

Neon was released July 12, 2011. Its first two singles, "Tomorrow" and "You", rose to number one, earning Young a five-song streak of chart-toppers. The follow-up single, "Neon", stalled at 23 on the Hot Country Songs chart. A fourth single, "I Can Take It from There", reached the top 5 on the newly separated Country Airplay chart but only top 20 on the combined-metric Hot Country Songs chart.

Young's fourth album, A.M., reached a career-high peak of 3 on the all-genre Billboard 200 chart and was also his first album to chart in both Australia and Canada (at 53 and 10, respectively). Three singles were released from the album, which all reached the Top 3 on the Country Airplay chart and the Top 10 on both the Hot Country Songs and the Canada Country airplay chart.

In 2015, Young released his fifth album, I'm Comin' Over, and earned his first number one on the Top Country Albums chart. The record was also Young's fastest record to be certified Gold by RIAA. The record's lead single of the same name reached number one on both the Country Airplay and Canada Country charts. "Think of You", a duet with Cassadee Pope, was Young's first single to feature another artist and also reached number one. His Vince Gill collaboration, "Sober Saturday Night", serves as the album's third single and third consecutive number one single.

Losing Sleep was released on October 20, 2017, and was his second album to reach number one on the Top Country Albums chart. Its lead single, the title track, reached number one on the Country Airplay chart. "Hangin' On", the album's second single, peaked at number two on the Country Airplay chart.

On January 28, 2019, Young released the leadoff single to his eighth studio album, "Raised on Country", which peaked at number 5 on the Country Airplay chart. "Drowning", the second single, stalled at number 25 on the Country Airplay chart. The third single, "Famous Friends", featuring Kane Brown, reached number one on the Country Airplay chart, and would be Young's first single featuring another artist to do so in five years. The album, also titled Famous Friends, was released on August 6, 2021, and peaked at number three on the Top Country Albums chart.

Studio albums

Extended plays

Singles

Other charted songs

Music videos

Notes

References

Country music discographies
Discographies of American artists